Judy Landers (born October 7, 1958) is an American film and television actress.

Early years
Landers is the daughter of Ruth Landers, and is the younger sister of actress Audrey Landers. She studied at the American Academy of Dramatic Arts.

Career
During the 1970s and 1980s, Landers, known for her ditzy persona and her busty figure, starred and made several guest appearances in many television series, including eight episodes of The Love Boat (1977), Happy Days (1977), 2 episodes of Charlie's Angels (1978), 14 episodes of Vega$ (1978-1979), 15 episodes of B. J. and the Bear (1979), The Jeffersons (1979), Buck Rogers in the 25th Century (1980), CHiPs (1980), three episodes of Fantasy Island (1980–84), The Fall Guy (1982), three episodes of Night Court (1984), L.A. Law (1986), Murder She Wrote (1987) and ALF. Landers was also a series regular for all 52 episodes of Madame's Place (1982–83).

She appeared twice in both the original Knight Rider (1982, 1985), and The A-Team (1985) television series, but as completely distinct characters with different story lines. Between 1978 and 1981, Landers appeared several times on Match Game and on Match Game-Hollywood Squares Hour.

Landers has also had film roles, including Goldie and the Boxer (1979), The Black Marble (1980), Hellhole (1985), Doin' Time (1985), Deadly Twins (1985), Stewardess School (1986), Armed and Dangerous (1986), Ghost Writer (1989), Dr. Alien (1989), Club Fed (1990), The Divine Enforcer (1992), Expert Weapon (1993), Dragon Fury (1995), Circus Camp (2006), and Manipulated (2019).

Judy and her sister Audrey were featured on the cover of the January 1983 issue of Playboy magazine, and they were in a non-nude pictorial.

Landers has often worked with Audrey, including collaborating with her on the children's show The Huggabug Club (1996), and The Treehouse Club (1997). Together with their mother Ruth, they own and operate Landers Productions and produced the family film Circus Island (2006).

References

External links
 
 

Actresses from Philadelphia
People from Rockland County, New York
American film actresses
American television actresses
Juilliard School alumni
Living people
21st-century American women
1958 births
American expatriate actresses in the United Kingdom